The 2016 AFC Champions League qualifying play-off was played from 27 January to 9 February 2016. A total of 21 teams competed in the qualifying play-off to decide eight of the 32 places in the group stage of the 2016 AFC Champions League.

Teams
The following 21 teams (8 from West Zone, 13 from East Zone) entered the qualifying play-off, which consisted of three rounds (preliminary round 1, preliminary round 2, play-off round):
Two teams (both from East Zone) entered in the preliminary round 1.
Seven teams (all from East Zone) entered in the preliminary round 2.
Twelve teams (8 from West Zone, 4 from East Zone) entered in the play-off round.

Format

In the qualifying play-off, each tie was played as a single match. Extra time and penalty shoot-out were used to decide the winner if necessary (Regulations Article 10.2). The eight winners of the play-off round advanced to the group stage to join the 24 direct entrants. All losers in each round which were from associations with only play-off slots entered the AFC Cup group stage.

Schedule
The schedule of each round was as follows.

Bracket

The bracket of the qualifying play-off was determined by the AFC based on the association ranking of each team, with the team from the higher-ranked association hosting each match. Teams from the same association could not be placed in the same play-off.

Play-off West 1
Al-Ittihad advanced to Group A.

Play-off West 2
El Jaish advanced to Group D.

Play-off West 3
Bunyodkor advanced to Group B.

Play-off West 4
Al-Jazira advanced to Group C.

Play-off East 1
Pohang Steelers advanced to Group H.

Play-off East 2
FC Tokyo advanced to Group E.

Play-off East 3
Shandong Luneng advanced to Group F.

Play-off East 4
Shanghai SIPG advanced to Group G.

Preliminary round 1

|-
|+East Zone

|}

Preliminary round 2

|-
|+East Zone

|}

Play-off round

|-
|+West Zone

|+East Zone

|}

West Zone

East Zone

References

External links
AFC Champions League, the-AFC.com

1